The Éridan is a two-stage French sounding rocket, which resulted from the use of the Stromboli engine of the Dragon and/or Dauphin as first and second stage. It belonged thereby to a family of solid-propellant rockets from the Belier (rocket), the Centaure (rocket), to the Dragon, the Dauphin and the Eridan. As the most powerful version of this series it could lift payloads from 100 to 420 kg to heights of 200 to a maximum of 460 km. Its climbing time is between 230 and 350 seconds.

The main launch site was Kourou, but the first start on 26 September 1968 from this site failed. Twelve additional launches took the rocket to altitudes of 196 – 420 km between 12 April 1969 and 14 November 1979. Two copies were launched in January and February 1975 off the Kerguelen Islands.

References

http://fuseurop.univ-perp.fr/sudav_e.htm

Other links
 Eridanos

1974 in spaceflight
Sounding rockets of France